Energy Reports  is a peer-reviewed open-access scientific journal covering all aspects of energy research. The journal was established in 2015 and is published by Elsevier. The editor-in-chief is Nelson Fumo (University of Texas at Tyler). Authors pay article processing charges, but do not retain unrestricted copyrights and publishing rights.

Abstracting and indexing
The journal is abstracted and indexed in Ei Compendex, Scopus, and the Science Citation Index Expanded. According to the Journal Citation Reports, the journal has a 2021 impact factor of 4.937.

References

External links

Engineering journals
Publications established in 2015
English-language journals
Elsevier academic journals
Creative Commons Attribution-licensed journals
Continuous journals